María Luisa (Marisa) Fernández Rodríguez (born 11 June 1953) is a Spanish mathematician specializing in differential geometry, symplectic geometry, and -structures. She is the professor of geometry and topology in the department of mathematics at the University of the Basque Country

Education and career
Fernández is originally from Ourense. She was a mathematics student at the University of Santiago de Compostela, earning a licentiate there in 1974 and completing her doctorate in 1976.

After postdoctoral research with Alfred Gray at the University of Maryland, College Park, she joined the faculty of science at the University of the Basque Country in 1986, becoming the first female professor in the faculty.

Recognition
In 1988, the government of the Province of Pontevedra gave Fernández the Antonio Odriozola Prize for basic research. She was a 2019 winner of the medal of the Royal Spanish Mathematical Society.

References

1953 births
Living people
20th-century Spanish mathematicians
Spanish women mathematicians
University of Santiago de Compostela alumni
Academic staff of the University of the Basque Country
21st-century Spanish mathematicians